Lycée Français de Medellin is a French international school in the  Medellín  metropolitan area in Colombia.  in the Loma of Escobero in Envigado, Antioquia.

In 2013,  at one of the headquarters of the French Alliance in Medellin, the gestation of the institution began with the accompaniment of the French government and a special business group, The project was well received as it was a widely recognised educational system at international level. For the year 2014 it was presented to the community and that same year began the construction of the first stage; and in 2015 we received our first students. 

We are a private educational institution, which accompanies with excellence, determination and discipline, the life project of the new generations with a unique educational model in the city of Medellín.  

It serves levels preschool through senior high school.

References

External links
  Lycée Français de Medellin

French international schools in Colombia
Medellín